President Lincoln and Soldiers' Home National Monument, sometimes shortened to President Lincoln's Cottage, is a national monument on the grounds of the Soldiers' Home, known today as the Armed Forces Retirement Home. It is located near the Petworth and Park View neighborhoods of Washington, D.C. President Lincoln's Cottage was formerly known as Anderson Cottage.

President Abraham Lincoln and family resided seasonally on the grounds of the Soldiers' Home to escape the heat and political pressure of downtown Washington, as did President James Buchanan (1857–1861) before him. President Lincoln's Cottage also served as the Summer White House for Presidents Rutherford B. Hayes (1877–1881) and Chester A. Arthur (1881–1885).

History
The historic Cottage, built in the Gothic revival style, was constructed from 1842 to 1843 as the home of George Washington Riggs, who went on to establish the Riggs National Bank in Washington, D.C.  Lincoln lived in the cottage June to November 1862 through 1864 and during the first summer living there, Lincoln drafted the preliminary draft of the Emancipation Proclamation. Mary Todd Lincoln fondly recalled the campus; in 1865, she wrote, "How dearly I loved the Soldiers' Home."

Poet Walt Whitman, who was living on Vermont Avenue near the White House in 1863, often saw the president riding to or from Soldiers' Home. He wrote in The New York Times, "Mr. LINCOLN generally rides a good-sized easy-going gray horse, is dressed in plain black, somewhat rusty and dusty; wears a black stiff hat, and looks about as ordinary in attire, &c., as the commonest man...I saw very plainly the President's dark brown face, with the deep cut lines, the eyes, &c., always to me with a deep latent sadness in the expression." Whitman quoted this article in his 1876 book Memoranda During the War, adding the phrase: "We have got so that we always exchange bows, and very cordial ones."

The Soldiers' Home stands on  atop the third highest point in Washington. The Home was designated a National Historic Landmark on November 7, 1973, and listed on the National Register of Historic Places on February 11, 1974. In 2000, the cottage was placed on the National Trust for Historic Preservation's 11 Most Endangered list. Then about 2.3 acres (9,300 m2) of the Home was proclaimed a National Monument by President Bill Clinton on July 7, 2000. The National Trust took on the restoration which was completed in 2007. The Cottage exterior was restored to the period of Lincoln's occupancy in the 1860s in a joint venture by  the Philadelphia firm J. S. Cornell & Son, and  Stephen Ortado, Historic Structures, according to the standards of the National Park Service. Today the property is leased by the National Trust for Historic Preservation through a cooperative agreement with the Armed Forces Retirement Home; and is managed by President Lincoln's Cottage at the Soldiers' Home, an independent 501(c)(3) charity.

President Lincoln's Cottage opened to the public on February 18, 2008. A reproduction of the Lincoln desk on which he wrote the Emancipation Proclamation was commissioned by the Trust for use in the Cottage. The original drop-lid walnut paneled desk is in the Lincoln Bedroom of the White House. The desk is the only surviving piece of furniture that is known to have been placed in the White House and the Cottage during the Lincoln era.

The adjacent Robert H. Smith Visitor Education Center features exhibits about the Soldiers' Home, wartime Washington, D.C., Lincoln as Commander-in-Chief during the Civil War, and a special exhibit gallery. President Lincoln's Cottage and Visitor Education Center is open to the public for tours seven days a week.

See also
 United States Soldiers' and Airmen's Home National Cemetery
 150th Pennsylvania Infantry
 List of national monuments of the United States

References

 Preservation Vol 59, Number 1, Jan/Feb 2007, page 6

External links

 Official website: President Lincoln's Cottage at the Soldiers' Home
 Armed Forces Retirement Home: Washington, D.C.
 National Trust: President Lincoln and Soldiers' Home National Monument
 Presidential Proclamation 7329 of July 7, 2000
 National Historic Landmark information
  Aerial view of exterior restoration of Lincoln Cottage at the Soldiers' Home
 Letters from Mary Todd Lincoln
 The Shot Through Abraham Lincoln's Hat
 
 
 
 
Booknotes interview with Matthew Pinsker on Lincoln's Sanctuary: Abraham Lincoln and the Soldiers' Home, December 21, 2003.
J.S. Cornell & Son

2000 establishments in Washington, D.C.
Monuments and memorials to Abraham Lincoln in the United States
Gothic Revival architecture in Washington, D.C.
Historic house museums in Washington, D.C.
Houses on the National Register of Historic Places in Washington, D.C.
Monuments and memorials in Washington, D.C.
National Monuments in Washington, D.C.
Presidential museums in Washington, D.C.
Protected areas established in 2000
National Trust for Historic Preservation